Rathavit Kijworalak (born February 19, 1997, in Thailand, nickname Plan  ) is a Thai series actor. Starting off his career as an actor at age 19 in the 2016 Thai TV series Make It Right the Series . He is best known for his role as Can or Cantaloupe in the 2018 Thai TV Series Love by Chance.

Profiles & Education 
Rathavit Kijworalak known as Plan was born on February 19, 1997, in Thailand. He has a sister who’s older than him.  He graduated from Demonstration School of Suan Sunandha Rajabhat University and he is currently a 4th year college student at Dusit Thani College major in Service Innovation in Tourism and Hotel Business.

Life Style 
He is a football lover and his favorite team is Manchester United F.C. His fashion is minimal style with shirt and ripped jeans, and slippers. He’s interested in cooking and he dreams to own a small restaurant.

Career 
He was suggested to cast in the Thai TV Series Make It Right the Series by Copy A Bangkok in 2016, he played the role of Wit. In 2018, he became well-known for his role as Can or Cantaloupe, his character in a BL TV series, “ Love By Chance “ that was  aired on GMM 25 and on Line TV. In 2020, he reprised his role as Can in Love by Chance 2: A Chance to Love alongside his on-screen partner, Phiravich Attachitsataporn (Mean)

Filmography

Television Drama

Television Series

Movies

Music Video

Other Works

References

External links 
 Plan Rathavit Instagram
 Plan Rathavit Twitter
 Plan Rathavit Facebook
 

Living people
1997 births
Rathavit Kijworalak